Benny Borg (born 13 November 1945) is a Swedish singer and composer.

He was born in Gothenburg, but moved to Norway in 1968, and was married to Kirsti Sparboe from 1972 to 1978. He is known for his cooperation with the Dizzie Tunes, and with Grethe Kausland. He won a Spellemannprisen award in 1973, and represented Norway in the Eurovision Song Contest 1972. In 2004 he won the Herman Wildenvey Poetry Award.

References

1945 births
Living people
Eurovision Song Contest entrants of 1972
Eurovision Song Contest entrants for Norway
Swedish male singers
Swedish expatriates in Norway
Spellemannprisen winners